The Kingdom of Ireland was a monarchy on the island of Ireland that was a client state of England and then of Great Britain. It existed from 1542 until 1801. It was ruled by the monarchs of England and then of Great Britain, and administered from Dublin Castle by a viceroy appointed by the English king: the Lord Deputy of Ireland. It had a parliament, composed of Anglo-Irish and native nobles. From 1661 until 1801, the administration controlled an army. A Protestant state church, the Church of Ireland, was established. Although styled a kingdom, for most of its history it was, de facto, an English dependency. This status was enshrined in Poynings' Law and in the Declaratory Act of 1719.

The territory of the kingdom comprised that of the former Lordship of Ireland which was founded in 1177 by King Henry II of England as part of the Anglo-Norman invasion of Ireland. By the 16th century, the effective area of English rule had shrunk greatly; most of Ireland was held by Gaelic nobles as principalities and chiefdoms. By the terms of the Crown of Ireland Act 1542, the Parliament of Ireland created Henry VIII of England as "King of Ireland". There followed an expansion of English control during the Tudor conquest. This in turn sparked the Desmond Rebellions and the Nine Years' War. The conquest of the island was completed early in the 17th century. The conquest involved the confiscation of land from the native Irish and the colonisation of the land with Protestant settlers from Great Britain.

In its early years, the kingdom had limited recognition; no Catholic country in Europe recognised Henry VIII or his successor, Edward VI, as kings of Ireland. The succeeding monarchs of the kingdom, Mary I and Philip II, were devout Catholics and so gained recognition from Pope Paul IV as co-monarchs of Ireland (1554–58). With the exception of James II of England, for the remainder of its existence, the Kingdom of Ireland was ruled by Protestant monarchs. Their Catholic subjects, who made up most of the population, suffered officially sanctioned discrimination.  Ireland suffered particularly harsh conditions during the years of The Protectorate, a period of military dictatorship in the British Isles under the control of Oliver Cromwell.  This discrimination was one of the main drivers behind several conflicts which broke out: the Irish Confederate Wars (1641–1653), the Williamite War in Ireland (1689–1691), the Armagh disturbances (1780s–1790s), and the republican Irish Rebellion of 1798.

The Protestant Ascendancy, meeting in their Parliament of Ireland, passed the Acts of Union 1800 which abolished both the parliament itself and the kingdom. The act was also passed by the Parliament of Great Britain. On the first day of 1801, a new state — the United Kingdom of Great Britain and Ireland — was established which united the parliaments of Ireland and of Great Britain into a single legislature — the Parliament of the United Kingdom — which still convenes today at the Palace of Westminster.

History

Background

The papal bull Laudabiliter of Pope Adrian IV was issued in 1155. It granted the Angevin King Henry II of England the title Dominus Hibernae (Latin for "Lord of Ireland"). Laudabiliter authorised the king to invade Ireland, to bring the country into the European sphere. In return, Henry was required to remit a penny per hearth of the tax roll to the Pope. This was reconfirmed by Adrian's successor Pope Alexander III in 1172.

When Pope Clement VII excommunicated the king of England, Henry VIII, in 1533, the constitutional position of the lordship in Ireland became uncertain. Henry had broken away from the Holy See and declared himself the head of the Church in England. He had petitioned Rome to procure an annulment of his marriage to Catherine of Aragon. Clement VII refused Henry's request and Henry subsequently refused to recognise the Roman Catholic Church's vestigial sovereignty over Ireland, and was excommunicated again in late 1538 by Pope Paul III. The Treason Act (Ireland) 1537 was passed to counteract this.

Tudor Ireland

Following the failed revolt of Silken Thomas in 1534–35, Grey, the lord deputy, had some military successes against several clans in the late 1530s, and took their submissions. By 1540 most of Ireland seemed at peace and under the control of the king's Dublin administration; a situation that was not to last for long.

Henry VIII was proclaimed King of Ireland by the Crown of Ireland Act 1542, an Act of the Irish Parliament. The new kingdom was not recognised by the Catholic monarchies in Europe. After the death of Edward VI, Henry's son, the papal bull of 1555 recognised the Roman Catholic Mary I as Queen of Ireland. The link of "personal union" of the Crown of Ireland to the Crown of England became enshrined in Catholic canon law. In this fashion, the Kingdom of Ireland was ruled by the reigning monarch of England. This placed the new Kingdom of Ireland in personal union with the Kingdom of England.

In line with its expanded role and self-image, the administration established the King's Inns for barristers in 1541, and the Ulster King of Arms to regulate heraldry in 1552. Proposals to establish a university in Dublin were delayed until 1592.

In 1593 war broke out, as Hugh O'Neill, earl of Tyrone, led a confederation of Irish lords and Spain against the crown, in what later became known as the Nine Years' War. A series of stunning Irish victories brought English power in Ireland to the point of collapse by the beginning of 1600, but a renewed campaign under Charles Blount, Lord Mountjoy forced Tyrone to submit in 1603, completing the Tudor conquest of Ireland.

Stuart Ireland
In 1603 James VI King of Scots became James I of England and Ireland, uniting the Kingdoms of England, Scotland and Ireland in a personal union. James established the Plantation of Ulster in 1606, the largest of all English and Scottish plantations in Ireland. Its legacy can be seen today, as most of Ulster remains a part of the United Kingdom, and retains a Protestant and Pro-Union majority in its population.

The political order of the kingdom was interrupted by the Wars of the Three Kingdoms starting in 1639. During the subsequent interregnum period, England, Scotland and Ireland were ruled as a republic until 1660. This period saw the rise of the loyalist Irish Catholic Confederation within the kingdom and, from 1653, the creation of the republican Commonwealth of England, Scotland and Ireland. The kingdom's order was restored 1660 with the restoration of Charles II. Without any public dissent, Charles's reign was backdated to his father's execution in 1649.

Grattan's Patriots

Poynings' Law was repealed in 1782 in what came to be known as the Constitution of 1782, granting Ireland legislative independence. Parliament in this period came to be known as Grattan's Parliament, after the principal Irish leader of the period, Henry Grattan. Although Ireland had legislative independence, executive administration remained under the control of the executive of the Kingdom of Great Britain. In 1788–1789 a Regency crisis arose when King George III became ill. Grattan wanted to appoint the Prince of Wales, later George IV, as Regent of Ireland. The king recovered before this could be enacted.

United Irishmen

The Irish Rebellion of 1798, and the rebels' alliance with Great Britain's longtime enemy the French, led to a push to bring Ireland formally into the British Union. By the Acts of Union 1800, voted for by both Irish and British Parliaments, the Kingdom of Ireland merged on 1 January 1801 with the Kingdom of Great Britain to form the United Kingdom of Great Britain and Ireland. The Irish Parliament ceased to exist, though the executive, presided over by the Lord Lieutenant, remained in place until 1922.

Viceroy

The Kingdom of Ireland was governed by a Lord Deputy or viceroy. The post was held by senior nobles such as Thomas Radcliffe. From 1688 the title was usually Lord Lieutenant.
In the absence of a Lord Deputy, lords justices ruled.
While some Irishmen held the post, most of the lords deputy were English noblemen. While the viceroy controlled the Irish administration as the monarch's representative, in the eighteenth century the political post of Chief Secretary for Ireland became increasingly powerful.

Parliament

The kingdom's legislature was bicameral with a House of Lords and a House of Commons. By the terms of Poynings' Law (1494) and other acts, the parliament's powers were greatly circumscribed. The legislature was content to "rubber stamp" acts or "suggestions" from the English parliament.

Roman Catholics and dissenters, mostly Presbyterians, Baptists, and Methodists, were excluded from membership of the Irish parliament from 1693. Furthermore, their rights were restricted by a series of laws called the Penal Laws. They were denied voting rights from 1728 until 1793.  The Grattan Parliament succeeded in achieving the repeal of Poynings' Law in 1782. This allowed progressive legislation and gradual liberalisation was effected. Catholics and Dissenters were given the right to vote in 1793, but Catholics were still excluded from the Irish Parliament and senior public offices in the kingdom. As in Great Britain and the rest of Europe, voting and membership of parliament was restricted to property owners. In the 1720s, the parliament was housed in a new building at College Green, Dublin.

Church of Ireland

When Henry VIII was excommunicated by the Catholic Church in 1538, all but two of the bishops in the island of Ireland followed the doctrine of the Church of England, although almost no clergy or laity did so. Having paid their Annates to the Papacy, the bishops had no reason to step down, and in the 1530s nobody knew how long the reformation would last. Unlike Henry VIII, this hierarchy was not excommunicated by the Papacy. They retained control of what became the State Church of the new Kingdom in 1542. As the established church, it retained possession of most Church property (including a great repository of religious architecture and other items, though some were later destroyed). In 1553, Irish Catholics were heartened by the coronation of Queen Mary I. In 1555, she persuaded the Pope to recognise the Kingdom in the papal bull "Ilius".

In 1558, a Protestant — Elizabeth I — ascended the throne. With the exception of James II of England, all the following monarchs adhered to Anglicanism. Contrary to the official plan, the substantial majority of the population remained strongly Roman Catholic, despite the political and economic advantages of membership of the state church. Despite its numerical minority, however, the Church of Ireland remained the official state church until it was disestablished on 1 January 1871 by the Liberal government under William Ewart Gladstone.

Ethnic conflict

The legacy of the Kingdom of Ireland remains a bone of contention in Irish-British relations to this day because of the constant ethnic conflict between the native Irish inhabitants and primarily the new  Anglo-Irish settlers across the island. Their background espoused English culture (law, language, dress, religion, economic relations and definitions of land ownership) in Ireland as it later did across much of what was to become the British Empire. However Gaelic culture and Irish language, was maintained to a significant extent by the majority of the original native population. Sometimes this was presented as "barbaric", "savage" which later was perceived by the native population as a mark of undesirability in respect of maintaining and learning the language. While the Lordship of Ireland had existed since the 12th century and nominally owed allegiance to the English monarchy, many kingdoms of Gaelic Ireland continued to exist; this came to an end with the Kingdom of Ireland, where the whole island was brought under the centralised control of an Anglo-centric system based in Dublin. This phase of Irish history marked the beginning of an officially organised policy of settler colonialism, orchestrated from London and the incorporation of Ireland into the British Empire (indeed Ireland is sometimes called "England's first colony"). The theme is prominently addressed in Irish postcolonial literature.

The religion of the native majority and its clergy — the Catholic Church — was actively persecuted by the state. A set of Penal Laws favoured those who adhered to the established church - the Church of Ireland. They oppressed those native Irish who refused to abjure their religion. A similar experience happened to English, Scottish and Welsh Catholics during the same period. There is some perception that during Tudor times, elements within the government at times engaged in and advanced a genocidal policy against the Irish Gaels, while during the Plantations of Ireland (particularly successful in Ulster) the local population were displaced in a project of ethnic cleansing where regions of Ireland became de-Gaelicised. This in turn led to bloody retaliations, which drag on to modern times. Some of the native inhabitants, including their leadership, were permitted to flee into exile from the country following ending up on the losing side in conflicts (i.e. the Flight of the Earls and the Flight of the Wild Geese) or in the case of the Cromwellian regime were forced into indentured servitude (although the same happened to English persons involved in the Cromwellian regime) in the Caribbean, following mass land confiscation for the benefit of New English settlers.

On the other hand, the fact that the kingdom had been a unitary state gave Irish nationalists in 1912–22 a reason to expect that in the process of increasing self-government the island of Ireland would be treated as a single political unit.

Coat of arms

The arms of the Kingdom of Ireland were blazoned: Azure, a harp Or stringed Argent. These earliest arms of Ireland are described in an entry that reads: Le Roi d'Irlande, D'azur à la harpe d'or, in a 13th-century French roll of arms, the Armorial Wijnbergen, also known as the Wijnbergen Roll, said to be preserved in The Hague, in the Netherlands but currently untraced; a copy is held in the Royal Library in Brussels (Collection Goethals, ms. 2569). This may have been an aspirational depiction for a putative High-King, for it was not related to the Lordship of Ireland at that time by the English king, who only assumed the title "King of Ireland" later in the reign of Henry VIII

A crown was not part of the arms but use of a crowned harp was apparently common as a badge or as a device. A crowned harp also appeared as a crest although the delineated crest was: a wreath Or and Azure, a tower (sometime triple-towered) Or, from the port, a hart springing Argent.

References

Citations

Sources

Further reading

 
 
 
 
 
 
 
 
 
 
 
 Keating, Geoffrey : The History of Ireland, from the Earliest Period to the English Invasion  (Foras Feasa Ar Éirinn) Translated by John O'Mahony 1866  Full text at Internet Archive
 
 
 
 
 
 
 
 
 
 Pawlisch, Hans S., : Sir John Davies and the Conquest of Ireland: A Study in Legal Imperialism :Cambridge University Press, 2002 :

External links
 The English in Ireland and the Practice of Massacre by John Minahane

1542 establishments in Ireland
1800 disestablishments in Ireland

Former countries in Europe
Former kingdoms in Ireland
History of the United Kingdom by country
Island countries
Monarchy in Ireland
States and territories disestablished in 1800
States and territories established in 1542
Ireland